Evips percinctus, or the False saddled snake-eel, is a species of eel in the family Ophichthidae. It is the only member of its genus. It is found only in the Pacific Ocean in the vicinity of Palau, occurring in reef environments.

References

Ophichthidae
Fish described in 1972